SS (RMS) Douglas (II) No. 45470 – the second vessel in the line's history to be so named – was an iron-built paddle steamer operated by the Isle of Man Steam Packet Company.

Douglas was the second of three ships ordered for the company from the yards of Caird & Co. of Greenock, and was launched on 11 May 1864.

Dimensions
Built at Greenock, Douglas cost £24,869.

She had one funnel forward and one aft of the paddle boxes, with the main mast close to the after funnel.

Service life

Gallery

Douglas was considered a successful ship, and was reboilered in 1869 at a cost of £4,000.

Disposal
After an uneventful career with the company, Douglas, along with her sister Tynwald, were disposed of by auction in 1888. The two ships together realised the sum of £24,622.

References

Bibliography

 

Ships of the Isle of Man Steam Packet Company
1864 ships
Steamships of the United Kingdom
Paddle steamers of the United Kingdom
Ferries of the Isle of Man
Ships built on the River Clyde
Merchant ships of the United Kingdom
Passenger ships of the United Kingdom